This list consists of lists of legislation.

By legislature and country

Australia
List of Acts of the Parliament of Australia
List of Acts of the First Legislative Council of New South Wales

Azerbaijan
List of Azerbaijan legislation

Bangladesh
List of Acts of the Jatiya Sangsad (1973 onwards)
List of ordinances issued in Bangladesh

British Isles
Legislation in the British Isles includes legislation of the United Kingdom, the Republic of Ireland, the Crown dependencies, the Kingdom of Great Britain, and the pre-union Kingdoms of England, Scotland and Ireland, and other former states. For the legislation of the kingdoms of the Heptarchy, see also Anglo-Saxon law. For Wales, see also Cyfraith Hywel. 
List of legislation in the United Kingdom 
List of Acts of the Parliament of England
List of Acts of the Parliament of Great Britain 
List of Acts of the Parliament of the United Kingdom 
List of Acts of the Parliament of Scotland to 1707 
List of Acts of the Scottish Parliament (1999 onwards) 
List of Acts of the Parliament of Ireland
List of Acts of the Parliament of Northern Ireland
List of Acts of the Northern Ireland Assembly 
List of Acts of the Oireachtas 
List of laws of Guernsey 
List of laws of Jersey
List of Acts of Tynwald

Canada
List of Acts of Parliament of Canada (1867 onwards)

China and Hong Kong
List of statutes of China
List of Hong Kong legislation

India
List of Acts of the Parliament of India (includes Acts of the Imperial Legislative Council and the Constituent Assembly of India)

Malaysia
List of Acts of the Parliament of Malaysia
List of Acts of Parliament in Malaysia by citation number

New Zealand
Lists of statutes of New Zealand (1840 onwards)

Nigeria
List of Nigerian legislation

Philippines
List of Philippine laws

Singapore
List of Acts of Parliament in Singapore

South Africa
List of Acts of the Parliament of South Africa (1910 onwards)
List of Acts of the Western Cape Provincial Parliament (1994 onwards)

Sri Lanka
List of Acts of the Parliament of Sri Lanka, 2010–present

United States
List of United States federal legislation

Statutory instruments
 List of Statutory Instruments of Australia
 List of Statutory Instruments of the United Kingdom
 List of Statutory Instruments of Scotland
 List of Statutory Instruments of the Welsh Assembly

Statutory rules
 List of Statutory Rules of Northern Ireland

Statutory rules and orders
List of Statutory Rules and Orders of the United Kingdom
List of Statutory Rules and Orders of Northern Ireland